Charlie (Charly) McCoy (born 14 December 1937) is a former British cycling record holder and Olympian.

Cycling career
McCoy competed in the team pursuit at the 1960 Summer Olympics.

McCoy also represented England in the 4,000 metres pursuit at the 1962 British Empire and Commonwealth Games in Perth, Western Australia in 1962.

He rode for his local Amateur team, Melling Wheelers and was coached by Eddie Soens. He broke the British 25 mile Time Trial record in 1961, finishing with a time of 55m 01s.

References

External links
 

1937 births
Living people
British male cyclists
Olympic cyclists of Great Britain
Cyclists at the 1960 Summer Olympics
Sportspeople from Liverpool
Cyclists at the 1962 British Empire and Commonwealth Games
Commonwealth Games competitors for England